PeaceWomen Across the Globe (PWAG), previously known as 1000 PeaceWomen, is an organization based in Bern, Switzerland that aims to increase the visibility of women promoting peace all over the world.

History
The organization began in 2003 under the direction of Ruth-Gaby Vermont-Mangold, then a member of the Swiss National Council, as an initiative to nominate 1000 women from over 150 different countries for the 2005 Nobel Peace Prize. The nomination was notable for including not only celebrities, but also relatively unknown women who have made significant contributions to world peace. Although the prize was ultimately awarded to the International Atomic Energy Agency, the initiative was successful in drawing public attention to the role of women in peacemaking. The organization went on to publish a book, and create an exhibition that was first displayed in Zurich, Switzerland, and has since appeared in over 25 countries, including places such as Xavier University in Cincinnati, Ohio; Lingnan University in Hong Kong, China; and at a UNESCO-sponsored exhibition in Geneva, Switzerland

Since 2006, PeaceWomen Across the Globe has been one of the NGO members of the Swiss Center for Peacebuilding, which contributes to Swiss foreign policy. The organization is also a member of the Global Network of Women Peacebuilders.

Members
Members of PWAG include:
Sakena Yacoobi, executive director of the Afghan Institute for Learning
Amina Afzali, member of the Afghan Cabinet of Ministers
Malalai Joya, Afghan politician
Jelka Glumičić, Croatian activist
Cynthia Basinet, American actress, singer
Runa Banerjee, Indian social worker and founder of Self Employed Women's Association (SEWA), Lucknow
Keepu Tsering Lepcha, Indian social worker and founder of Human Development Foundation of Sikkim (HDFS), Sikkim
Sevim Arbana, Albanian women's rights activist.

Works
1000 peacewomen across the globe, Scalo, 2005,

See also
List of peace activists
List of women pacifists and peace activists

References

External links
Official site

Organizations established in 2003
Organisations based in Bern
Women's organisations based in Switzerland